Roy Sinclair is a Scottish curler.

In 2000–2006 he was the president of the World Curling Federation.

He is the author of the book Curling Basics: A Comprehensive Guide to the Game of Curling.

Awards
World Curling Freytag Award: 2007
In 2012 he was inducted to World Curling Federation Hall of Fame

Teams

References

External links
 

Living people
Scottish male curlers
Scottish curling champions
Year of birth missing (living people)